Tommy Haas and Radek Štěpánek were the defending champions, but they withdrew in the quarterfinals, before their match against Denis Istomin and Dudi Sela.
Mardy Fish and Sam Querrey won in the final 7–6(7–3), 7–5, against Benjamin Becker and Leonardo Mayer.

Seeds

Draw

Draw

References

SAP Open
SAP Open - Doubles
2010 SAP Open